Gobius tetrophthalmus is a species of marine fish from the family Gobiidae, the true gobies. It prefers areas with coralline algae though it will also inhabit areas with substrates of sand and rock. This species can reach a length of  TL. It is harmless to humans.

References

tetrophthalmus
Fish of West Africa
Endemic vertebrates of Cape Verde
Tropical fish
Fish described in 2001